Baseline Ventures is a venture capital investment firm that focuses on seed and growth-stage investments in technology companies. The company was the first seed investor in Instagram, an early investor of Twitter and has been called "one of Silicon Valley's most successful — and smallest — investment firms" by Forbes. It is headquartered in San Francisco, California. They also do commercial representation of some athletes. 

The company's founder and Managing Partner, Steve Anderson, was recognized on Fortune's 2012 list of "50 Businesspeople of the Year" and included on the Forbes Midas List from 2012 to 2020.

History

Anderson founded Baseline in 2006. He previously worked for Kleiner Perkins Caufield & Byers, Microsoft, eBay and Starbucks. Anderson has a Master of Business Administration from Stanford University and has invested in companies founded by Stanford alumni including Kevin Systrom and Mike Krieger of Instagram; Katrina Lake of Stitch Fix; and Jeff Seibert of Crashlytics.

Baseline Ventures also represents some athletes such as Mayank Agarwal, Lakshya Sen and Sneh Rana.

Acquisitions and investments

Baseline Ventures has invested in software and web companies that include Instagram, Weebly, OMGPop, ExactTarget and Heroku. Instagram was acquired by Facebook for $1 billion in 2012. Later that year, Baseline-backed OMGPop was acquired by Zynga for approximately $200 million. Salesforce.com acquired Heroku for $212 million in 2010.

References

External links
 Official site

Venture capital firms of the United States
Financial services companies established in 2006